John Boekenfoehr (born January 28, 1903, in West Point, Nebraska) was an American clergyman and bishop for the Roman Catholic Diocese of Kimberley. He became ordained in 1927. He was appointed bishop in 1953. He died in 1982.

References

20th-century Roman Catholic bishops in the United States
1903 births
1982 deaths
People from West Point, Nebraska
Roman Catholic bishops of Kimberley